Rah Ahan Sports Club (Bashgah-e Vârzeshi-ye Rahâhen), commonly known as Rah Ahan Football Club, is an Iranian professional football club based in Tehran. They currently play in the Azadegan League. Rah Ahan is the oldest Iranian football club.

History

Establishment
Rah Ahan was formed in 1937 in Tehran by Iran Railways but were bought by Mehr Afarin Holding. They are one of the oldest Iranian football clubs still in existence.

In 1939 Rah Ahan participated in the Tehran Local League for the first time. Their first official match was on 4 January 1940 against Bazargani F.C.; they won the game 11–0.

Rah Ahan is currently owned by the businessman Mehrafarin Holding.

1950s
During the World War in the 1940s Rah Ahan dissolved its football operations, and did not restart its team until the 1950s. After its re-establishment the club under the name of Pirouz played on the dirt pitches near the railway station. The players of the team were railway workers. In 1955 with the arrival of Rasoul Madadnavi from Tabriz, the club was again renamed to Rah Ahan and began to attract players from outside the railway company. After achieving good results in the 1958 season Rah Ahan was promoted to the 1st Division Tehran League. However, due to new restrictions regarding private clubs in the Tehran Local Leagues, the club was denied the right to compete and eventually ceased its operations.

Pre-Revolution
In 1963 Rah Ahan was again re-established and were placed in the 2nd Division Tehran Local League. In 1966 Rah Ahan was finally promoted to the top division of the Tehran Local Leagues. In 1973 the Takht Jamshid Cup, Iran's first national league, was founded. In their first two years in the Cup, Rah Ahan finished a respectable 7th and 9th. In 1976 they were relegated to the 2nd Division. In their only season in the 2nd Division, Rah Ahan finished 1st in the league and were again promoted to the Takht Jamshid Cup. In 1978 they were again relegated to the 2nd Division, but they could not finish the 2nd Division season because of the Iranian Revolution.

Iran Pro League
After the establishment of the Iran Pro League in 2001, Rah Ahan was placed in the second tier Azadegan League. In 2005 Rah Ahan was promoted to the Iran Pro League after a second-place finish in the Azadegan League. Since then they have mostly been an average team and have finished in the mid-table, but since the arrival of Ansarifard as the chairman they have looked more stable. They finished 11th in the 2008–09 season and avoided relegation in the season after the last week.

Ali Daei
In the 2012–13 season, under Ali Daei, the team got out to an early start, and were 4th in the Iran Pro League after the opening few weeks. After that the team had an average year, dropping to 8th by the season's end. In the same year they went on tour in Turkey, beating Galatasaray A2 4–1, and losing to Super Lig side Istanbul BB 3–2. At the end of the 2012–13 season Ali Daei left Rah Ahan to sign with Persepolis.

Trouble years
Mansour Ebrahimzadeh was announced as Rah Ahan's new manager for the 2013–14 season. With him in charge Rah Ahan finished an average 11th place. At the end of the season, Ebrahimzadeh announced that he was stepping down as Rah Ahan's manager. Former Persepolis manager Hamid Estili was named as his replacement. Rah Ahan encountered severe financial problems and under Estili the club performed poorly. Estili was soon fired and replaced with former Rah Ahan player Farhad Kazemi.

In the 2015–16 season, Rah Ahan ran into financial troubles, finished 15th in the Persian Gulf Pro League and were relegated. This was the first time Rah Ahan would play in the Azadegan League in 12 years.

Season-by-season
For details on seasons, see List of Rah Ahan F.C. seasons

Reserves

The table below shows the achievements of the club's reserve team in various competitions.

First-team squadAs of 19 January 2016 U23

Loan listFor recent transfers, see List of Iranian football transfers winter 2015–16.

Former players
For details on former players, see :Category:Rah Ahan players.

Managers

IPL managers
Last updated 23 October 2017.

Coaching staff

References

External links

Football clubs in Tehran
Association football clubs established in 1937
1937 establishments in Iran